Abhijit is the 22nd lunar mansion out of 28 in the Indian system of nakshatra. 
Abhijit is the Sanskrit name for Vega, the brightest star in the northern constellation of Lyra. Abhijit means "the victorious One" or "the One who cannot be defeated" In the Mahabharata (Harivamsa).

History

In the Srimad Bhagavatam, Krishna tells Arjuna, that among the Nakshatras he is Abhijit, which remark indicates the auspiciousness of this Nakshatra.  In the Bhagavad Gita Chapter 10 Verse 21, it is mentioned as Shashi (Moon) rather than as Abhijit.

Its longitude starts from 06° 40' to 10° 53' 20 in sidereal Capricorn i.e. from the last quarter of nakshatra Uttara Ashādhā to first 1/15 th part of Shravana. Hence, Abhijit nakshatra is not a regular nakshatra with four padas or quarters and thus it serves as an intercalary asterism most of the time. It is not mentioned as frequently as the other asterisms in mythology.
The Moon or Chandra is said to have 27 (not 28) wives with whom he stays for one day in a sidereal lunar month. Each of the 27 asterisms is feminine: only Abhijit is masculine.  Abhijit Nakshatra is an auspicious time in the Hindu Calendar.

See also
List of Nakshatras

References

Nakshatra